Gemini Man is a short-lived American action-adventure drama series that aired on NBC in 1976. The third television series based on H. G. Wells' 1897 science-fiction novel The Invisible Man, Gemini Man was created to replace the previous season's The Invisible Man using simpler and less expensive special effects.

Plot
The series starred Ben Murphy as laid-back, denim-clad, motorcycle-riding secret agent Sam Casey, who while diving to retrieve a fallen Soviet spy satellite, was exposed to radiation in an underwater explosion, which rendered him invisible.  The agency for which he worked, a high-tech government think tank called Intersect (International Security Techniques), found a way to return him to visibility and control his new power by the use of a special wristwatch referred to as a "DNA stabilizer", which was invented by scientist Abby Lawrence (Katherine Crawford).  Pressing a button on the digital watch would make him vanish, clothes and all, which was a helpful tool in his line of work, but he could only do this for 15 minutes per day or else he would die.

Reception 
A pilot of the series aired on May 10, 1976, and the series began airing on September 23 of that year. The show was cancelled after five episodes due to low ratings and relatively high production costs.  Although 11 episodes were produced, the remaining six were not aired in the United States, although the entire series was seen in Britain with somewhat greater success that led to a record album and hardcover annual based on the show.  Richard Dysart played Casey's boss, Leonard Driscoll, in the pilot and William Sylvester played Driscoll during the series.

Cast
 Ben Murphy as Sam Casey
 Katherine Crawford as Abby Lawrence
 William Sylvester as Leonard Driscoll
 Quinn K. Redeker as Brighton

Episodes

Pilot

Series

Television movie
Two episodes, "Smithereens" and "Buffalo Bill Rides Again", were re-edited into one 90-minute television film titled Riding with Death, released in 1981.

The film used scenes from Colossus: The Forbin Project as establishing shots for sweeping computer-room scenes. The "Guardian" logo ("Guardian" was the Russian version of "Colossus") appears in at least one segment. Though not immediately verifiable, at least one segment uses the "Colossus" speaker/microphone.

Production had to deal with Crawford departing the series by the latter episode, the length of time between filming (Sylvester had grown a thick, bushy mustache in the interim), and the appearance of an arch-villain in the second "half" who did not exist in the opening (covered by an overdub referring to the villain's elusiveness in the final minutes of the first segment). Both parts feature singer Jim Stafford as a trucker named Buffalo Bill, who befriends and helps Sam.

In 1997, Riding with Death was featured in an eighth-season episode of movie-mocking television show Mystery Science Theater 3000. Mike Nelson and his robot friends highlighted the thin connection between the two halves, and the general incoherence of the plot.

Home media 
The complete television series was released as a region 2 DVD in the French territory in November 2013 by Elephant Films with two language tracks, French and English.  The episodes are uncut.

References

External links

 

1976 American television series debuts
1976 American television series endings
1970s American science fiction television series
English-language television shows
Fiction about invisibility
Films scored by Lee Holdridge
NBC original programming
Television shows based on British novels
Television series by Universal Television
Television shows set in North Carolina